Tribhuvan Bir Bikram Shah (30 June 1906  – 13 March 1955) was King of Nepal from 11 December 1911 until his death. Born in Kathmandu, the capital city of Nepal, he ascended to the throne at the age of five, upon the death of his father, Prithvi Bir Bikram Shah, and was crowned on 20 February 1913 at the Nasal Chowk, Hanuman Dhoka Palace in Kathmandu, with his mother acting as regent. At the time of his crowning, the position of monarch was largely ceremonial, with the real governing power residing with the Rana family.

Family

Tribhuvan was born on 30 June 1906 to Prithvi Bir Bikram Shah and Divyeshwari Lakshmi Devi Shah. After the death of his father, Tribhuvan Bir Bikram Shah ascended the throne on 11 December 1911, at the age of five. Queen Mother Divyeshwari Lakshmi Devi was appointed the regent until Tribhuvan would come to his age.

He married at age 12 in a double ceremony. He married first at the Narayanhity Royal Palace, Kathmandu, March 1919 to Kanti. The same day he also marries Ishwari. He also had junior wives.

His first child and successor to the throne, Mahendra Bir Bikram Shah Dev, was born when both Tribhuvan and his wife, Queen Kanti Rajya Lakshmi Devi Shah, were just 13 years old, on 11 June 1920.

Later life
Tensions between the royal family and the Ranas began during World War I. The Ranas wanted to join the war in support of Britain. The Shahs were reluctant and wished to remain neutral. The then prime minister, Chandra Shamsher Jang Bahadur Rana, pressured the young king and threatened his mother, eventually forcing Tribhuvan to order the troops to war.

By the mid-1930s, popular discontent with the Ranas led to the establishment of several movements, notably the Nepal Praja Parishad, to which Tribhuvan himself gave his explicit support, to overthrow the Ranas. In each instance, however, the Ranas responded harshly, banning the liberal movements and executing their leaders. Tribhuvan worked closely with the Praja Parishad to abolish the Rana regime.

In November 1950, King Tribhuvan took refuge at the Indian Embassy. He was accompanied by his son Mahendra and the eldest grandson Birendra, among others. The then prime minister, Mohan Shamsher Jang Bahadur Rana became furious and responded to Tribhuvan's move by calling an emergency meeting of the cabinet on 7 November 1950 at Singha Durbar. In that meeting he announced Gyanendra Bir Bikram Shah, the four-year-old grandson of Tribhuvan, the new King of Nepal. On 10 November, two Indian planes landed at Gauchar Airport (now called Tribhuvan International Airport) and the royal family fled to New Delhi excluding the infant King, Gyanendra. Tribhuvan was formally welcomed by the Indian prime minister Jawahar Lal Nehru and other high officials. 

The removal of the king led to huge demonstrations in the country that compelled the Rana prime minister, Mohan Shamsher Jang Bahadur Rana to negotiate with Tribhuvan and the Nepali Congress. On 22 November 1950, Jawahar Lal Nehru, the Prime Minister of India, officially announced that India was not going to recognize Gyanendra Bir Bikram Shah as the legitimate King of Nepal.

When Mohan Shumsher saw that the situation was out of his control, he sent the king's brother-in-law, Sir Kaiser Shamsher Jang Bahadur Rana and Bijaya Shamsher Jang Bahadur Rana to New Delhi for peace talks. In New Delhi, King Tribhuvan, representatives of Nepali Congress and of the Rana Government all sat together to discuss the situation. At last an agreement was reached according in which King Tribhuvan was to form a new ministry, under his leadership, consisting of the Nepali Congress and the Ranas on an equal basis.

Tribhuvan then flew back to Nepal, along with the members of the Royal family and the leaders of the Congress Party on 15 February 1951. On 18 February 1951, Tribhuvan returned from India as the monarch. Three days after the return, Tribhuvan formally declared an end to Rana's family rule and established a democratic system, but Mohan Shumsher Jung Bahadur Rana continued as the prime minister for a few more months.

Congress Rana Government
According to the New Delhi Agreement, Tribhuvan announced on 13 February 1951, a cabinet headed by Mohan Shamsher Jang Bahadur Rana. The following were the members of the Cabinet.

From the Rana clan:

Sir Mohan Shamsher – Prime minister and Foreign Affairs.
Sir Baber Shamsher Jang Bahadur Rana- (younger brother of Mohan Shamsher; was in line for the next premiership) – Defence.
Chudraj Shamsher – ("B" class Rana representative) – Forests.
Nripa Janga Rana – ("C" class Rana representative) – Education.
Yagya Bahadur Basnyat – (Rana Bhardar) – Health and Local self-government.

From the Nepali Congress side:

Bishweshwar Prasad Koirala – Home.
Subarna Shamsher Rana- (even though a Rana, he represented the Nepali Congress) – Finance.
Ganesh Man Singh – Commerce and Industry
Bharatmani Sharma – Food and Agriculture
Bhadrakali Mishra  – Transport.

This cabinet was reshuffled on 10 June 1951 to replace Baber Shamsher by Shangha Shamsher and Bharatmani Sharma by Surya Prasad Upadhyaya. This cabinet was dissolved in November 1951 and MP Koirala became the new Prime Minister.

Death
Tribhuvan died in 1955 in Zürich, Switzerland. He was succeeded by his eldest legitimate son, Mahendra.

Condolence message by Indian Parliament
So, on the passing of His Majesty King Tribhuvan Bir Bikram Shah, the late King, I am sure this House would like to express its sorrow and would like it to be conveyed to his family. Also, at the same time, I am sure this House would like to send its greetings to the new King Mahendra Bir Bikram Shah and wish him all success in the difficult responsibilities and burdens that have come to him. Above all, we would send our good wishes to the people of Nepal in the great adventures in building up their country on a democratic and prosperous basis that they are indulging in. Thereafter. M. Ananthasayanam Ayyangar. the Speaker observed: On behalf of the House, I associate myself with what the Honorable Leader of the House has said. We certainly send our greetings and all best wishes for the new King and for the people of Nepal. As a mark of respect and our sense of sorrow at the demise of the late King, the House will stand in silence for a minute.The international airport in Kathmandu, Tribhuvan International Airport, the oldest highway in Nepal Tribhuvan Highway, the 2nd oldest association football tournament in Nepal, Tribhuvan Challenge Shield, a city, Tribhuvannagar in Dang valley, and the country's largest university (Tribhuvan University) are named after him.

Issue

Children born to primary wives 
King Tribhuvan had two official wives who were crowned queen consorts:
 Queen Kanti Rajya Lakshmi Devi Shah (1906–1973), crowned senior queen consort on the same day as her marriage to the king, in 1919. They had four children:
 King Mahendra of Nepal (1920–1972), married firstly Princess Indra Rajya Lakshmi Devi Shah and secondly Princess Ratna Rajya Lakshmi Devi Shah. He had children by his first wife;
 Prince Himalaya of Nepal (1921–1980), married Princess Princep Rajya Lakshmi Devi Shah. He had no children;
 Princess Trilokya of Nepal (born 1922), married Raj Kumar Sri Hardyal Singh. She had children;
 Princess Vijaya of Nepal (born 1925), unmarried;
 Princess Bharati of Nepal (1927–2020), married Maharaja Sri Pradeep Chandra Bhanj Deo, the Maharaja of Mayurbhanj. She had children.
 Queen Ishwari Rajya Lakshmi Devi Shah (1907–1983), crowned junior queen consort on the same day as her marriage to the king, in 1919. They had two children:
 Prince Basundhara of Nepal (1921–1977), married Princess Helen Rajya Lakshmi Devi Shah. He had children;
 Princess Nalini of Nepal (1924–2020), married Raja-i-Rajgan Raja Shri Shiv Rattan Dev Singh Sahib Kalan Bahadur, the Raja of Poonch. She had children.

Honours
 National
 Sovereign of the Order of Ojaswi Rajanya
 Sovereign of the Order of Nepal Taradisha
 Sovereign of the Order of Gorkha Dakshina Bahu
 Sovereign of the Order of Tri Shakti Patta

Foreign
 Grand Cordon of the Order of the Supreme Sun, 1 March 1950
 Grand Cross of the Order of Merit of Italian Republic, 16 October 1954
 Grand Cross of the Legion of Honour, 1954

Ancestry 
He is a descendant of popular personalities such as Maharaja Jang Bahadur Kunwar Ranaji, Kaji Tularam Pande, Sardar Ramakrishna Kunwar and Kaji General Amar Singh Thapa.

References 

|-

Nepalese monarchs
Field marshals
Knights Grand Cross of the Order of Merit of the Italian Republic
Grand Croix of the Légion d'honneur
World War II political leaders
Child monarchs from Asia
1906 births
1955 deaths
National heroes of Nepal
Nepalese Hindus
Kingdom of Nepal
Shah dynasty
Hindu monarchs